Shatrughan Prasad Singh  is an Indian politician. He was elected to the Lok Sabha, the lower house of the Parliament of India from the Balia in Bihar as a member of the Communist Party of India.

References

External links
Official biographical sketch in Parliament of India website

Communist Party of India politicians from Bihar
India MPs 1996–1997
Lok Sabha members from Bihar
1943 births
Living people